Selma Dabbagh (born 1970) is a British-Palestinian writer who gained fame in 2011 with Out of It, a novel centered on the Israeli–Palestinian conflict, which was nominated for a Guardian Book of the Year award in 2011 and 2012.

Born in Scotland, Dabbagh is the daughter of a Palestinian father from Jaffa and an English mother. Now a full-time writer of fiction, she has spent lengthy periods in Kuwait, France, Egypt and Bahrain, with almost annual visits to Palestine. Before concentrating on writing, she worked as a human rights lawyer in London with frequent visits to the West Bank and Cairo. Since 2004, she has written short stories which have appeared in New Writing 15 and Qissat: Short Stories by Palestinian Women. She has twice been a finalist in the Fish Short Story Prize for Beirut-Paris-Beirut (2005) and Aubergine (2004). In 2014, her radio play The Brick was broadcast by BBC Radio 4.

References

1970 births
Living people
20th-century Palestinian women writers
20th-century Palestinian writers
21st-century Palestinian women writers
21st-century Palestinian writers
21st-century British novelists
21st-century British women writers
British dramatists and playwrights
Palestinian dramatists and playwrights
Palestinian novelists
Palestinian women writers
People from Dundee
Writers from Dundee